Muhammad Ali Abdallah Muhammad Bwazir is a citizen of Yemen, once held in extrajudicial detention in the United States Guantanamo Bay detainment camps, in Cuba.
Bwazir's Guantanamo Internment Serial Number was 440.
American intelligence analysts estimate he was born in 1980, in Hawra', Yemen.

Bwazir arrived in Guantanamo on May 1, 2002.

In December 2015, unnamed officials leaked that Congress had been given notice that 17 individuals would be transferred from Guantanamo starting in thirty days.  
The US military planned to transfer the last three of those seventeen on January 21, 2016.  Both his lawyers and military officials were surprised when Bwazir balked at the last moment, and declined repatriation.

On January 5, 2017, Bwazir and three other Yemeni men were transferred to Saudi Arabia.

Hunger strike
The Washington Post reports that Bwazir's lawyers assert that Bawazir was one of those participating in the 2006 Guantanamo hunger strike, and that the new harsher procedures camp authorities instituted to break the hunger strike violated last fall's proscription on torture.

Camp authorities have been force-feeding hunger strikers.  In January 2006, camp authorities started using "restraint chairs" to feed detainees.

The Center for Constitutional Rights quoted from the emergency injunction Bwazir's lawyers filed on his behalf, in reaction to what they described as the unnecessary violence of his force-feeding in the restraint chair:
 Forcibly strapped Mr. Bawazir into a restraint chair, tying his legs, arms, head, and midsection to the chair.
 Inserted of a feeding tube that was larger than the tube that had previously been left in Mr. Bwazir's nose, increasing the pain of the insertion and extraction.
 Poured four bottles of water into his stomach through the nasal gastric tube every time he was fed even though Mr. Bawazir has never refused to drink water by mouth.
 Restrained Mr. Bawazir in the chair for extended periods at each feeding.
 Denied Mr. Bawazir access to a toilet while he was restrained and then for an additional hour or more after he was released from the chair.
 Placed Mr. Bawazir in solitary confinement.

Medical records show Bwazir's weight had dropped to 97 pounds, during the 140 days of his hunger strike.
Medical records show Bawazir was restrained in the chair longer than the manufacturer's directions.

Lieutenant Colonel Jeremy Martin asserted that the force-feedings were conducted humanely.  He explained the extraordinary duration of the detainee's confinement to the restraint chair was due to the length of time the force-feeding took.

U.S. government lawyers argued that the bans on torture and cruel and unusual treatment didn't apply to captives in Guantánamo Bay.
Justice Gladys Kessler called the allegations "extremely disturbing".

On February 11, 2009, US District Court judge Gladys Kessler declined to bar the use of restraint chairs for force-feeding 
Mohammed Ali Abdullah Bwazir and 
Omar Khamis Bin Hamdoon.
Kessler has noted that Bwazir and Hamdoon's petition stated that the use of the restraint chair was "tantamount to torture".
However, she stated the opinion that because she lacked the medical expertise to evaluate the position of the camp's medical authorities she lacked jurisdiction to rule on the petition.

According to the Agence France Presse, Bwazir and Hamdoon were not opposed to being force fed, and so claimed in their petition that the use of restraints was unnecessary.
According to the Agence France Presse, camp authorities are withholding medical treatment for their other ailments from the hunger strikers, in an attempt to pressure them to quit their strike.

Official status reviews

Originally, the Bush Presidency asserted that captives apprehended in the "war on terror" were not covered by the Geneva Conventions, and could be held indefinitely, without charge, and without an open and transparent review of the justifications for their detention.
In 2004, the United States Supreme Court ruled, in Rasul v. Bush, that Guantanamo captives were entitled to being informed of the allegations justifying their detention, and were entitled to try to refute them.

Office for the Administrative Review of Detained Enemy Combatants

Following the Supreme Court's ruling, the Department of Defense set up the Office for the Administrative Review of Detained Enemy Combatants.

Scholars at the Brookings Institution, led by Benjamin Wittes, listed the captives still held in Guantanamo in December 2008, according to whether their detention was justified by certain common allegations:

 Mohammed Ali Abdullah Bwazir  was listed as one of the captives who "The military alleges ... are associated with both Al Qaeda and the Taliban."
 Mohammed Ali Abdullah Bwazir  was listed as one of the captives who "The military alleges ... traveled to Afghanistan for jihad."
 Mohammed Ali Abdullah Bwazir  was listed as one of the captives who "The military alleges that the following detainees stayed in Al Qaeda, Taliban or other guest- or safehouses."
 Mohammed Ali Abdullah Bwazir  was listed as one of the captives who "The military alleges ... took military or terrorist training in Afghanistan."
 Mohammed Ali Abdullah Bwazir  was listed as one of the captives who "The military alleges ... fought for the Taliban."
 Mohammed Ali Abdullah Bwazir  was listed as one of the captives who "The military alleges that the following detainees were captured under circumstances that strongly suggest belligerency."
 Mohammed Ali Abdullah Bwazir  was listed as one of the captives who was a foreign fighter.
 Mohammed Ali Abdullah Bwazir  was listed as one of the captives who "deny affiliation with Al Qaeda or the Taliban yet admit facts that, under the broad authority the laws of war give armed parties to detain the enemy, offer the government ample legal justification for its detention decisions."
 Mohammed Ali Abdullah Bwazir was listed as one of the eight captives who could not be fit into the Wittes team's other classifications.

habeas corpus

A habeas corpus petition was filed on Bwazir's behalf in 2005.

Formerly secret Joint Task Force Guantanamo assessment

On April 25, 2011, whistleblower organization WikiLeaks published formerly secret assessments drafted by Joint Task Force Guantanamo analysts.
His 9-page Joint Task Force Guantanamo assessment was drafted on October 27, 2008.
It was signed by camp commandant Rear Admiral David M. Thomas Jr. He recommended continued detention.

References

External links 
 Who Are the Remaining Prisoners in Guantánamo? Part Two: Captured in Afghanistan (2001) Andy Worthington, September 17, 2010
Mohammed Ali Abdullah Bwazir: Allegations of Abuse

Detainees of the Guantanamo Bay detention camp
Yemeni extrajudicial prisoners of the United States
Living people
Year of birth uncertain
1980 births